Batsheva Katznelson (born 1897, died 30 August 1988) was an Israeli politician who served as a member of the Knesset for the General Zionists between 1951 and 1955.

Biography
Born in Bar in the Russian Empire (today in Ukraine), Katznelson made aliyah to Ottoman-controlled Palestine in 1911, and attended Herzliya Hebrew High School in Tel Aviv. During World War I, she was expelled to Egypt by the Ottoman authorities. She later studied humanities at the University of Geneva. She worked as a teacher for 18 years.

One of the leader of the Organization of Hebrew Women, she attended the first Women's International Zionist Organization convention in 1926. She later became a member of WIZO's national committee, and chairwoman of the Jerusalem branch.

In 1951, she was elected to the Knesset on the General Zionists list, but lost her seat in the 1955 elections.

In 1918, Katznelson married Reuven Katznelson, becoming the sister-in-law of Rachel Katznelson-Shazar, wife of Zalman Shazar, the third president of Israel. Her children were the educator Shulamit Katznelson and Shmuel Tamir, who later served as a Knesset member from 1965 until 1981 and as Minister of Justice. She died in 1988.

References

External links

1897 births
1988 deaths
People from Bar, Ukraine
People from Mogilyovsky Uyezd (Podolian Governorate)
Jews from the Russian Empire
Ukrainian Jews
Emigrants from the Russian Empire to the Ottoman Empire
Israeli people of Ukrainian-Jewish descent
Jews in Ottoman Palestine
Jews in Mandatory Palestine
Israeli Jews
General Zionists politicians
Herzliya Hebrew Gymnasium alumni
University of Geneva alumni
Israeli educators
Israeli women educators
Jewish women politicians
Members of the 2nd Knesset (1951–1955)
Women members of the Knesset
20th-century Israeli women politicians